Lisya is a rural locality (a village) in Polozovoskoye Rural Settlement, Bolshesosnovsky District, Perm Krai, Russia. The population was 189 as of 2010. There are 6 streets.

Geography 
Lisya is located 55 km south of Bolshaya Sosnova (the district's administrative centre) by road. Pozory is the nearest rural locality.

References 

Rural localities in Bolshesosnovsky District